The Last Princess may refer to:

 The Last Princess (TV series), a 2008 Chinese television series
 The Last Princess (film), a 2016 South Korean film
 Kakushi Toride no San-Akunin: The Last Princess, a 2008 Japanese film
 The Last Princess, a 2012 novel by Galaxy Craze